Tuckahoe is a Native American word that may refer to:

Plants and fungi 
Peltandra virginica, also called tuckahoe; the rhizome was cooked and used as food by Native Americans
Orontium aquaticum, also called tuckahoe; the seeds and rhizome were used as food by Native Americans
Wolfiporia extensa, also called tuckahoe; the sclerotium of a fungus used as food by Native Americans and by the Chinese as a medicinal

Buildings in the United States 
Tuckahoe Plantation, boyhood home of Thomas Jefferson, Virginia
Tuckahoe (Jensen Beach, Florida) or the Leach Mansion, Jensen Beach, Florida

Natural formations in the United States 
Tuckahoe Bay, in South Carolina
Tuckahoe Creek, in Maryland
Tuckahoe River (disambiguation)
Tuckahoe Group, geologic group, Virginia

Places in the United States

Maryland
Tuckahoe State Park, a public park in Maryland

Missouri
Tuckahoe, Missouri, an unincorporated community

New Jersey
Tuckahoe, New Jersey, an unincorporated community in Upper Township, Cape May County
Tuckahoe station (New Jersey)

New York
Tuckahoe (village), New York, a village in Eastchester, Westchester County
Tuckahoe (Metro-North station), a railroad station in the village
Tuckahoe Union Free School District, a public school district that serves the village
Tuckahoe High School, a school in the village
Tuckahoe, Suffolk County, New York, a hamlet in Suffolk County

Pennsylvania
Camp Tuckahoe, a Boy Scouts of America camp in York County

Virginia
Tuckahoe, Virginia, a census-designated place in Henrico County
Tuckahoe Recreation Center, a private aquatic complex in McLean, Virginia

West Virginia
Tuckahoe, West Virginia, an unincorporated community

See also
 Tuckahoe culture
 Tuckahoe and Cohee
 RuPaul’s Drag Race